Santo Domingo Formation is a mainly marine Miocene sedimentary formation located in south–central Chile. Sediments of the formation accumulated in Valdivia and Osorno–Llanquihue Basin.

The formations overlies basement consisting of metamorphic and igneous rocks; the Bahía Mansa Metamorphic Complex and Cretaceous granitoids respectively. In parts, it further overlies the coal–bearing Pupunahue–Catamutún Formation. The sedimentary facies of the Santo Domingo Formation are composed of sandstone, siltstone and mudstone and smaller amounts of conglomerate. The formation underlies Pliocene and Quaternary sediments.

Fossil content 

Some of the trace fossils that can be found in Santo Domingo formation are Zoophycos isp., Chondrites isp., Phycoshiphon isp., Ophiomorpha isp. Thalassinoides isp., Asterosoma isp. and Terebellina isp.

The benthic foraminifera found in Santo Domingo Formation are broadly similar to those found in other Chilean sedimentary formations of the Neogene like Navidad Formation of Central Chile, Ranquil Formation of Arauco Province and Lacui Formation of Chiloé Island. 
 The most common formaineral species of Santo Domingo Formation are Hansenisca altiformis, Rectuvigerina transversa and Sphaeroidina bulloides.

See also 

 Ancud Volcanic Complex
 Panguipulli Batholith

References

Bibliography 
 
 
 
 

Geologic formations of Chile
Miocene Series of South America
Neogene Chile
Sandstone formations
Siltstone formations
Mudstone formations
Shallow marine deposits
Fossiliferous stratigraphic units of South America
Paleontology in Chile
Geology of Los Ríos Region
Geology of Los Lagos Region